Kinross Gold Corporation is a Canadian-based gold and silver mining company founded in 1993 and headquartered in Toronto, Ontario, Canada. Kinross currently operates six active gold mines, and was ranked fifth of the "10 Top Gold-mining Companies" of 2019 by InvestingNews. The company's mines are located in Brazil, Mauritania, and the United States. It trades under the KGC ticker in the New York Stock Exchange, and under K in the Toronto Stock Exchange.

Operations
Kinross Gold operates mines in North and South America, and West Africa. In 2022, 58% of Kinross gold production is expected to come from the Americas.

Fort Knox
This property includes a mill, tailings storage, heap leach facility, the Gil project, and the True North open pit mine, which is closed and under monitoring. Expected to run out of ore in 2021, the mine's life has been extended to 2030 following a $100 million expansion investment announced in 2018, increasing life-of-mine production by about 1.5 million gold equivalent ounces.

Round Mountain
The Round Mountain Gold Mine is located in Nye County, Nevada and has operated by Kinross since 2003. They purchased the remaining outstanding interest in the company from Barrick Gold in 2016.

Bald Mountain
Located in White Pine County, Nevada, the Bald Mountain mine is operated by subsidiary KG Mining (Bald Mountain) Inc.

Paracatu
The open-pit Paracatu gold mine, located in northwest Minas Gerais, Brazil.

Tasiast
Kinross acquired the Tasiast mine (located in Mauritania) in 2010, expanding the operation twice by 2017.

In 2012, securities class action lawsuits launched in the U.S. and Canada, alleging Kinross Gold overstated the value of Tasiast mine in its financial statements, misrepresented some of the mine's project expansion schedules, and made other false statements. In 2015, the parties reached no-fault settlement agreements which included payments by Kinross totaling approximately $US 40 million.

In June 2016, due to "government allegations of invalid work permits" for expatriate employees, the mine suspended operations, resuming them in August that same year.

In May 2020, there was a short strike by unionized employees at the mine, which was suspended at the request of the Mauritanian government. A month later, Kinross reached an agreement in principle with the government, which included revalued royalties.

Chirano
Kinross holds 90% ownership of the Chirano gold mine, with the remainder held by the Government of Ghana. In April 2022, Kinross announced plans to sell its 90% ownership for US$225-million to Asante Gold Corp.

History

Founding and early years

Kinross Gold Corporation was founded in 1993, following the amalgamation of three companies: Plexus Resources Corporation, CMP Resources and numbered company 1021105 Ontario Corp., resulting in the new company owning a stake and royalties in a mining property in Fallon, Nevada and the QR Mine in British Columbia. On June 1, 1993, Kinross was listed on the Toronto Stock Exchange and NASDAQ, then on the New York Stock Exchange in 1994.
 
Kinross' first project – now operated by its subsidiary Fairbanks Gold Mining – was the Fort Knox Gold Mine, an open-pit mining operation in Alaska. The area, including surrounding deposits, was prospected as early as 1913, but no mining took place until 1996. The mine currently produces over 200,000 ounces of gold a year.
 
In 1998, a wholly owned subsidiary of Kinross merged with Amax Gold, forming Kinam Gold, the company's largest subsidiary. effectively transferring ownership of the mine back to Kinross, along with Maricunga Gold Mine in Chile, as part of the merger.

1999 – 2006
Kinross acquired Hollinger Mines in 1999 as part of a land package prior to the bankruptcy of Royal Oak Mines (later sold to Goldcorp in 2006). Also that year, Kinross acquired LA Teko Resources Ltd. through its wholly owned subsidiary, LT Acquisition Inc. division.
 
In July 2002, Kinross and Placer Dome combined their assets in Timmins, Ontario and formed the Porcupine Joint Venture (51% Placer Dome, 49% Kinross). In January 2003 Kinross TVX Gold and Echo Bay Mines shareholders approved a $3-billion merger, combining the three companies, while retaining the name Kinross Gold. The TVX merger resulted in Kinross' stake in the La Coipa open pit mine, the remainder being purchased from Goldcorp in 2007.

In 2006, Kinross bought Crown Resources Corporation, which gave it ownership of the mineral resource Buckhorn Mountain (later Buckhorn Gold Mine) and the associated mineral processing facilities.

2007 – present
In 2007, Kinross traded assets with Goldcorp; Kinross received $200 million and the remaining portion of the La Coipa Gold Mine it had acquired with the TVX merger, in exchange for giving up its 49% of the Porcupine Joint Venture and 31.9% of the Musselwhite mine.
 
In 2010, Kinross purchased 91% of Red Back Mining for $7.1 billion. The purchase brought with it the two gold mines in Africa (Chirano and Tasiast). In 2011, Kinross entered into a share purchase agreement with the State Unitary Enterprise of the Chukotka Autonomous Okrug, whereby it held 100% of the Kupol mine and exploration licenses. Kinross sold its interest in the Crixás mine to AngloGold Ashanti in 2012.

In December 2017, Kinross acquired mineral rights to Gilmore, or Parcel G, a 709-acre tract adjacent to its Fort Knox Gold Mine, about 25 miles northeast of Fairbanks, Alaska. Estimates of the land valued it as containing 2.1 million ounces of gold.

In December 2021, Kinross offered to acquire Great Bear Resources for $29 per share, or about $1.8 billion, giving it ownership of a mine in Red Lake, Ontario, Canada. The deal is expected to close in Q1 2022. Kinross shares dropped 9% after it announced the buyout bid.

Non-operating, discontinued and divested mines
 Julietta Mine - Julietta is a gold and silver mine located in the Omsukchansky District of Magadan Oblast, near Russia's far eastern border.
 Kettle River-Buckhorn - the Washington-state based mine and mill were acquired by Kinross in 2006, and was closed in 2017.
 Mineral Hill - located on the east side of Crevice Mountain, Montana, Mineral Hill operated from 1990 to 1996. In 2017, Kinross donated water rights representing 3 billion gallons of water to Trout Unlimited to protect fish habitat in tributaries of the Yellowstone River.
 Cerro Casale - Chile-based mine acquired by Kinross in 2007. As of 2015, the mine was inactive, and Kinross divested in 2017.
 Crixás - Kinross sold its 50% interest in the Brazil-based mine to AngloGold Ashanti for $220 million.
 Fruta del Norte - Kinross purchased 100% of outstanding shares in the Ecuadorian deposit in 2008, but ceased development in 2013, and sold the rights in 2014.
 La Coipa - Kinross incurred an impairment charge of $124 million in 2014 after development on the Chile-based mine ceased. In February 2020, Kinross announced it was proceeding with the La Coipa Restart project to mine the Phase 7 deposit, expected to operate from 2022 to 2024.
 Lobo-Marte - After acquiring 40% interest in the Chile mine in 2008, Kinross acquired the remaining interest in 2009, for a total cost of $182 million. The results of a pre-feasibility study at Lobo-Marte was announced in July 2020. Subject to development decision, project construction will begin in 2025, with production expected in 2027.
 Maricunga - Operations ceased in August 2016, after the Chilean government shut off the mine's water supply over environmental concerns. As a result, 300 employees were laid off, and Kinross incurred an impairment charge of $68 million.
Acquired in 2010 and opened in 2013, Dvionoye/Kupol was one of Kinross' most profitable segments. In April 2022, Kinross announced that it was selling 100% of its Russian assets to the Highland Gold Mining, completing the sale of Russian assets two months later.

Financial Performance

Gold production 

Annual gold production (millions of ounces) was:
 
 2013 - 2,631
 2014 - 2,710
 2015 - 2,594 
 2016 - 2,789
 2017 - 2,673
 2018 - 2,450 
 2019 - 2,507
 2020 - 2,366
 2021 - 2,063

Gold reserves 
Kinross' proven and probable gold reserves were 32.6 million ounces as of December 31, 2021.

Assets
Kinross Gold's total assets decreased significantly in recent years, from $US 16.39 billion in 2010 to $US 7.73 billion in 2015.

Other
Kinross suspended dividend payments in 2013. It started paying again in 2020, and that year, also announced a share buyback program.
 
In 2015 in the wake of declining gold prices, Kinross closed their office in Denver and eliminated 110 corporate positions in Denver, Chile, Spain, and Toronto.
 
In 2016, Standard & Poor's lowered Kinross' credit rating to junk bond status, largely based on the share of their production that came from mines in Russia, which the agency saw as a significant risk.
 
In 2017, Moody's Investors Service assigned a Ba1 rating to Kinross, "primarily driven by the company's good scale (2.78 million gold-equivalent ounces (GEO) as of March 2017 LTM), low leverage (1.7x LTM adjusted Debt/EBITDA), and very good liquidity (SGL-1).

On March 2, 2020, Moody's announced it had upgraded Kinross's credit rating to investment grade. Their senior unsecured notes rating was upgraded to Ba1, with a stable outlook. Kinross currently holds investment grade ratings from Moody's, S&P Global Ratings, and Fitch Ratings.

Corporate responsibility
In 2015, Kinross achieved an A− ranking in Maclean's magazine's annual assessment of socially responsible companies, the highest ranking of any Canadian mining company.
 
For Kinross' cooperation with an environmental group in Washington state, and for five out of eight mines being in compliance with the International Cyanide Management Code (as of May 2013, the Company had eight of its nine mines in compliance with the International Cyanide Management Code), Kinross was recognized as one of Canada's Top 50 Most Responsible Corporations by Maclean's magazine and Jantzi Research in 2009.
 
Through a $1 million donation by Kinross in 2010, the University of Guelph created a new chair as part of its BetterPlanet Project. Said Chair is named the Kinross Chair in Environmental Governance, and is held by a "succession of experts". Also with the university, Kinross provided $100 thousand towards its Fight Against Hunger.
 
In 2010, Kinross committed to contribute $10 million over a three-year period towards developing a mining school in Mauritania. The following year, it committed $2.5 million to build and equip a medical emergency centre in that country.
 
In 2013, Kinross was named to the Dow Jones Sustainability World Index for the third consecutive year, as well as the DJSI North American Index, the Ethibel Excellence Investment Register, and the Ethical Global Equity and ECPI Global Carbon Indices. For the fifth consecutive year, the Company was named to the Jantzi Social Index, and as one of Canada’s Best 50 Corporate Citizens by Corporate Knights magazine for the fourth year. In 2016, Kinross was ranked the 8th best of 92 oil, gas, and mining companies on indigenous rights in the Arctic. In 2021, Kinross was ranked no. 22 out of 120 oil, gas, and mining companies involved in resource extraction north of the Arctic Circle in the Arctic Environmental Responsibility Index (AERI).

Carbon footprint 
Kinross Gold reported Total CO2e emissions (Direct + Indirect) for the twelve months ending 31 December 2020 at 1,631 Kt (+19/+1.2% y-o-y). There have been not any significant reductions in emissions in recent years. In May 2021, Kinross committed to reaching net-zero greenhouse gas emissions by 2050.

See also

 Gold as an investment

References

External links

 
 SEDAR company profile
 Google Finance company profile
 

 
Companies listed on the New York Stock Exchange
Companies listed on the Toronto Stock Exchange
S&P/TSX 60
Gold mining companies of Canada
Companies based in Toronto
Non-renewable resource companies established in 1993
Silver mining companies of Canada
Mining companies